Guljar Devi Yadav is an Indian politician. She was elected to the Bihar Legislative Assembly from Phulparas. She is a member of the Bihar Legislative Assembly as a member of the JDU. Her husband Deo Nath Yadav also served as a member of the Bihar Legislative Assembly from Phulparas constituency.

References

Bihar MLAs 2010–2015
Bihar MLAs 2015–2020
Janata Dal (United) politicians
1960 births
Living people
People from Madhubani district